Christopher O'Malley  (born January 24, 1963) is the current President and  CEO of LogRhythm an American security software company headquartered in Broomfield, Colorado. He is best known for his business turnaround leadership achieving renewed growth, stability and profitability after a prolonged span of financial hardship, ineffective business strategies and mismanagement through continuous improvement in customer satisfaction, employee engagement, and the "why we work."

Career
Christopher O'Malley became President and CEO of LogRhythm in February 2022. Since his appointment, LogRhythm has introduced a quarterly cadence of innovation delivery under the theme, "Promises Made. Promises Kept." which including the release of LogRhythm's newest product, Axon, a groundbreaking, cloud-native security operations platform. 

O’Malley was formerly President and CEO of Compuware Corporation, an American software company headquartered in Downtown Detroit, Michigan, in December 2014 after serving as its President of mainframe operations for six months. His nomination came soon after the acquisition of the company by Thoma Bravo for $2.5 Billion and its split of the mainframe business into a new company. O'Malley led the turnaround of Compuware and the introduction of ground-breaking Compuware tools to enable Agile and DevOps on the mainframe. In March 2020, Compuware was acquired by BMC Software.  He was best known for his advocacy of the mainframe platform, as well as enabling Agile software development, DevOps toolchains and Value Stream methods in managing the mainframe.

O'Malley has held senior management and board member positions in a number of IT companies, including LogRhythm (October 2021 - Present), Greenphire (October 2021 - Present), Compuware (December 2014 - 2020), Bluenog (December 2009 – March 2016), Nimsoft, Inc. (April 2011 - July 2012), YJT Solutions (July 2012 - March 2015), and VelociData, Inc. (September 2012 – July 2015). He has also founded Christopher Ventures LLC established in July 2012.

From October 1988 to July 2012, O’Malley served at CA Technologies as  Senior Vice President of Sales,  General Manager and Executive Vice President of Mainframe Business Unit, Executive Vice President of Cloud Products and Solutions Business Line, General Manager of Growth Markets and CEO of Nimsoft (a CA Technologies Business Unit).

O'Malley has been interviewed on Bloomberg national radio and by the Wall Street Journal for his thought leadership within IT and is a featured interviewee and contributor of podcasts, articles and columns to technology, business and government focused publications.  And, O'Malley was honored as one of the top 50 names to know in IT by Crain's Detroit Business in 2017, named best DevOps evangelist by DevOps.com in 2019, selected as one of the Top 25 Government IT Executives of 2020 by IT Services Report, and selected by Sigma Chi Fraternity as a Significant Sig in 2017.

O'Malley is the founder & board member of the O'Malley Foundation, a charitable organization that grants college scholarships to deserving students, as well as, supports various youth arts programs & Catholic charities.

References

External links 
 The O'Malley Foundation
 Christopher Ventures
 Compuware official Web site

1963 births
Living people
People from Mound, Minnesota
American technology chief executives
University of Minnesota alumni